Li Hongzao (1820–1897), styled Lansun, pseudonym Shisun, was a high government official towards the end of the Qing dynasty. One of his sons was Li Shizeng, a prominent politician in the Chinese Nationalist Party.

Official career
Li was born in Gaoyang County, Zhili, in present-day Hebei province. In 1861, the two dowagers empresses chose Li Hongzao, Qi Junzao, and Weng Xincun, who were all Imperial teachers, to instruct the newly enthroned Tongzhi Emperor in the classics. The Emperor, who was less than five years old at the time, displayed little or no interest in his studies, and would concentrate only when Li was instructing him. Li rose to be vice-president of the Board of Revenue and Grand Councilor, and in 1872 became head of the Board of Works. He then retired for a three-year period, 1877-1880, as required by custom and statute at the death of his mother.

Upon his return to office, he resumed his post with the Grand Council and the Zongli Yamen, which was in effect the dynasty's Ministry of Foreign Affairs. In 1884, Li and all the Grand Councillors, such as Yixin, who had been supported by the Empress Dowager, Cixi, were dismissed in a dispute with a group of conservative officials. He was gradually given permission to resume responsibilities, but often criticized for not carrying them out promptly. After the outbreak of the First Sino-Japanese War in 1894, he was given even greater duties, but died in 1897.

Family
 Son: Li Shizeng

Notes

1820 births
1897 deaths
Qing dynasty diplomats
Qing dynasty politicians from Hebei
Politicians from Baoding
Grand Councillors of the Qing dynasty
Assistant Grand Secretaries
Ministers of Zongli Yamen
Imperial tutors in Qing dynasty